Heavy Gauge is the 6th album by Japanese rock band Glay. This is the first album which Glay dabbles in the genres of progressive rock and gospel, using progressive chords on songs like the self-titled track, and using gospel choirs in songs such as "Will Be King" and "Happiness". This album also marks a milestone in Glay's career with their hit song "Winter, Again". The song won Single of the Year (1999) at the Japan Record Award. Many songs from the album were used in the Meiji Seika Kaisha advertising campaigns for their "Horn" and "Flan" product food lines. The album reached #1 on Oricon charts and sold about  2,370,000. The album was certified "Double Million" by the Recording Industry Association of Japan (RIAJ).

Track listing
Heavy Gauge - 6:52
Fatsounds - 3:50
Survival - 4:24
 (Translation: To somewhere, that is not here) - 5:49
Happiness - 5:51
Summer FM - 5:11
Level Devil - 5:06
Be with You - 5:10
Winter, Again - 5:14
Will Be King - 7:30
 (Translation: Something to live for) - 5:57
 - 4:35

Bonus Tracks:
Young Oh! Oh!
Hello My Life
 (Translation: Poisonous Rock)

Album chart information
Oricon Top Ranking: #1

References

External links
 Oricon - Glay's profile on the Oricon
 Happy Swing Space Site - Official Site

Glay albums
1999 albums
Pony Canyon albums